Lubomyr Ivansky (born November 1, 1983) is a Ukrainian former footballer.

Playing career 
Ivansky began his career in 1998 with FC Karpaty-2 Lviv in the Ukrainian Second League. In 2000, he spent time in the Ukrainian Premier League with the senior team FC Karpaty Lviv. He played with Lviv for five seasons and also featured with the club's reserve team FC Karpaty-3 Lviv in the Ukrainian Second League. After the relegation of Karpaty Lviv he signed with Obolon Kyiv in the Ukrainian First League. In 2006, he went abroad to Poland to sign with Wisła Płock of the Ekstraklasa, and won the Polish Cup.

The following season, he returned to Ukraine to play with FC Stal Alchevsk. The remainder of his time would be spent in the Ukrainian First & Second Leagues with FC Arsenal-Kyivshchyna Bila Tserkva, FC Komunalnyk Luhansk, Karpaty Kamenka-Bug, FC Desna Chernihiv, FC Rukh Vynnyky. In 2010, he returned to Poland to sign with Resovia Rzeszow in the II Liga. In 2016, he went overseas to Canada to sign with FC Ukraine United in the Canadian Soccer League. In his second season he assisted FC Ukraine in achieving a perfect season, and winning the Second Division Championship. While in his third year he assisted in securing the First Division title.

Honors

Wisła Płock 
 Polish Cup (1): 2006

FC Ukraine United 
 CSL Second Division Championship (1): 2017
 Canadian Soccer League First Division (1): 2018

References

External links
 

1983 births
Living people
Sportspeople from Lviv
Ukrainian footballers
Ukrainian expatriate footballers
FC Karpaty Lviv players
FC Karpaty-2 Lviv players
FC Karpaty-3 Lviv players
FC Obolon-Brovar Kyiv players
FC Obolon-2 Kyiv players
Wisła Płock players
FC Stal Alchevsk players
FC Stal-2 Alchevsk players
FC Arsenal-Kyivshchyna Bila Tserkva players
FC Komunalnyk Luhansk players
FC Desna Chernihiv players
FC Rukh Lviv players
FC Ukraine United players
Ukrainian Premier League players
Ekstraklasa players
Canadian Soccer League (1998–present) players
Expatriate footballers in Poland
Association football defenders
Ukrainian First League players
Ukrainian Second League players
II liga players